Aminah Beverly McCloud (born 1948) is Professor of Religious Studies and Director of Islamic World Studies program at DePaul University. Her areas of expertise include Islam in America, Muslim women, Islamic studies and the history, geography, politics, religion and philosophy of Islam. She is the author and co-author of several books. Professor McCloud is also the Editor in Chief of the Journal of Islamic Law and Culture, and a member of the board of advisors of the Institute for Social Policy and Understanding (ISPU).

Professor Ali Asani of Harvard University has described Professor McCloud as "one of the most eminent scholars of African American Islam"

Publications
 African-American Islam (1995)
 Questions of Faith (1999)
 Transnational Muslims in American Society (2006)
 An Introduction to Islam in the 21st Century (2013)

References

1948 births
Living people
DePaul University faculty
American religious writers
Women religious writers
20th-century American non-fiction writers
21st-century American non-fiction writers
20th-century American women writers
21st-century American women writers
American women academics
Women scholars of Islam
American Islamic studies scholars
African-American Muslims
Muslim scholars of Islamic studies